, is a Japanese singer, songwriter, musician, record producer and actor. Noda is the lead vocalist, songwriter and guitarist of the Japanese rock band Radwimps and also began a solo project, Illion, in 2012.

Life and career

Early life, Radwimps 

Noda was born in Tokyo, Japan, to a businessman father and piano teacher mother. From the ages of six to ten, Noda lived overseas in the United States. He first became interested in the guitar in junior high school, after hearing Oasis. He tried to learn how to play the chords with a guitar his family owned.

While studying his first year of high school at Tōin Gakuen in Yokohama, he joined a band in 2001. He joined after being asked by a friend to be the band's vocalist. The band was named Radwimps, and Noda became the band's vocalist, guitarist, and sole songwriter. They released their debut independent album, Radwimps, in 2003, and the band made their major debut under Toshiba EMI in 2005. In 2006, the band became widely popular in Japan, with their fourth album Radwimps 4: Okazu no Gohan being certified platinum.

In 2008, Noda produced a song for another artist for the first time. He wrote and produced the song "Labrador" for Japanese singer Chara, which was used as the leading promotional track for her album Honey. In 2015, Noda wrote the song  for Hanaregumi's sixth studio album What Are You Looking For.

Solo career 

Noda's solo project, Illion, was first announced in November 2012. He began the solo career in order to perform overseas, which is a goal his band, Radwimps, did not share. His debut album, Ubu, was released in Japan and Europe, first on February 25, 2013, in the United Kingdom. The album was promoted with two singles, "Brain Drain" in January 2013, which received a 24-hour exclusive live music video, and "Maharoba," which was released in February 2013. Noda first performed live as Illion at the O2 Shepherd's Bush Empire in London on March 17, 2013. He also performed at the Indra Musikclub in Hamburg, Germany on March 19. He planned to perform at the Tokyo Rocks rock festival in Tokyo on May 12, however the event was cancelled.

In 2015, Noda made his debut as an actor in the film Pieta in the Toilet, which he starred in as the lead character Hiroshi. Radwimps also performed the theme song for the film, entitled . In May, Noda debuted as an author with Rarirure-ron, a book of essays written while RADWIMPS were on their Grand Prix 2014 Jikkyō Namachūkei tour of Japan, as well as his decision to star in Pieta in the Toilet.

In 2016, Noda resumed his Illion solo project with a series of live concerts in July. This began with a performance at the Fuji Rock Festival, followed by two solo billed concerts in Tokyo and Osaka, billed as his Illion Japan Tour 2016.

In 2019, Noda composed the theme song 気まぐれ雲 for the movie Day and Night.

Discography

Studio albums

Singles

Production discography

Filmography

Bibliography 
 (2015), Bungeishunjū,

Notes

References

External links 

Official website

1985 births
English-language singers from Japan
Japanese essayists
Japanese expatriates in the United States
Japanese male actors
Japanese rock guitarists
Japanese male rock singers
Living people
Singers from Tokyo
Universal Music Japan artists
Warner Music Japan artists
21st-century Japanese singers
21st-century guitarists
21st-century Japanese male singers